Devon Saal (born 6 June 1992) is a South African footballer who plays professionally for Richards Bay, as a winger or forward.

Personal
Saal hails from Mitchells Plain on the Cape Flats.

References

1992 births
Living people
South African soccer players
Association football midfielders
Association football forwards
Sportspeople from Cape Town
Cape Coloureds
Milano United F.C. players
Santos F.C. (South Africa) players
Maritzburg United F.C. players
Stellenbosch F.C. players
National First Division players
South African Premier Division players